University Theatre may refer to:

 University Theatre (Bristol)
 University Theatre (Edinburgh)
 University Theatre (Toronto)